The Necker Nymph is a submersible vehicle operated by Virgin Aquatic from the 32-metre yacht Necker Belle, which is based at the Virgin Limited Edition resort Necker Island in the British Virgin Islands.

The Necker Nymph is the initial example of the DeepFlight Merlin class of positively-buoyant open-cockpit wet subs manufactured by Hawkes Ocean Technologies. It relies on hydrodynamic forces for anti-lift force. It is 4.5 metres long, capable of 360-degree "hydrobatic" manoeuvres, can dive up to 40 metres underwater, and seats one pilot and two passengers in an open cockpit (necessitating wearing scuba gear). Occupants have a "windscreen" to protect them from the water's slipstream.

References

External links
 

Virgin Limited Edition
Personal submarines
Wet subs
Individual watercraft